The Women's mass start competition of the Beijing 2022 Olympics was held on 18 February, at the National Biathlon Centre, in the Zhangjiakou cluster of competition venues,  north of Beijing, at an elevation of . Justine Braisaz-Bouchet of France won the event. It was her first individual Olympic medal. Tiril Eckhoff of Norway won the silver medal, and Marte Olsbu Røiseland, also of Norway, bronze.

Summary
The 2018 champion, Anastasiya Kuzmina, and the silver medalist, Darya Domracheva, retired from competitions. The 2014 and 2018 bronze medalist, Eckhoff, dominated the 2020–21 Biathlon World Cup, winning not only overall but also sprint and pursuit. The overall leader of the 2021–22 Biathlon World Cup before the Olympics was Olsbu Røiseland, and the leader in mass start was Dorothea Wierer. Olsbu Røiseland won the sprint and pursuit races at the 2022 Olympics.

Qualification

Results
The race was started at 15:00.

References

Biathlon at the 2022 Winter Olympics
Women's biathlon at the 2022 Winter Olympics